The following is a list of wars involving Tanzania since its formation in 1964.

References

Tanzania
Wars involving Tanzania
Wars